Liolaemus leopardinus (leopard tree iguana) is a species of lizard in the family Iguanidae.
It is endemic to Chile.

References

leopardinus
Lizards of South America
Endemic fauna of Chile
Reptiles of Chile
Reptiles described in 1932
Taxonomy articles created by Polbot